Pleurotus australis, the brown oyster mushroom, is a gilled fungus native to Australia and New Zealand.  It is found on dead wood.  Although morphologically similar to some other Pleurotus fungi, it has been shown to be a distinct species incapable of cross-breeding.

See also
List of Pleurotus species

References

External links
 Biological Species in Pleurotus: ISG XIV. Pleurotus australis at University of Tennessee-Knoxville Mycology Lab

Pleurotaceae
Fungi described in 1887
Fungi native to Australia
Fungi of New Zealand
Edible fungi